China competed at the 2018 Winter Olympics in PyeongChang, South Korea, from 9 to 25 February 2018. China competed in 12 sports, participating in bobsleigh, skeleton, and ski jumping for the first time. China won 9 medals in total.

Liu Jiayu won a silver medal in the Women's halfpipe, the first-ever medal in snowboarding for China. Gao Tingyu won a bronze medal in the Men's 500m speed skating event and became the first male speed skater from China to win a medal in Olympic speed skating. Wu Dajing won a gold medal in the Men's 500 m short track speed skating event and became the first male short track speed skater from China to win a gold medal in Olympic short track speed skating. He also broke the world record.

With Beijing being the host of the 2022 Winter Olympics, a Chinese segment was performed at the closing ceremony. Those 2022 Winter Olympics made Beijing the first city to host both Winter and Summer Olympics, after they hosted the 2008 Summer Olympics.

Medalists

Records

Competitors 
The following is the list of number of competitors that participated in the Games per sport/discipline.

Alpine skiing

China qualified one male and one female alpine skier.

Biathlon

China qualified two female biathletes.

Bobsleigh 

Based on their rankings in the 2017–18 Bobsleigh World Cup, China had qualified 3 sleds.

* – Denotes the driver of each sled
Wang Chao was the teams alternate and did not compete.

Cross-country skiing

China qualified two male and two female cross-country skiers.

Distance

Sprint

Curling 

Summary

Women's tournament

China qualified a women's team by qualifying via the qualification event in Plzeň, Czech Republic.

Round-robin
China had a bye in draws 4, 8, and 12.

Draw 1
Wednesday, 14 February, 14:05

Draw 2
Thursday, 15 February, 09:05

Draw 3
Thursday, 15 February, 20:05

Draw 5
Saturday, 17 February, 09:05

Draw 6
Saturday, 17 February, 20:05

Draw 7
Sunday, 18 February, 14:05

Draw 9
Monday, 19 February, 20:05

Draw 10
Tuesday, 20 February, 14:05

Draw 11
Wednesday, 21 February, 09:05

Mixed doubles tournament

Based on results from the 2016 World Mixed Doubles Curling Championship and 2017 World Mixed Doubles Curling Championship, China had qualified their mixed doubles as the highest ranked nations.

Draw 1
Thursday, February 8, 9:05

Draw 2
Thursday, February 8, 20:04

Draw 3
Friday, February 9, 8:35

Draw 4
Friday, February 9, 13:35

Draw 5
Saturday, February 10, 9:05

Draw 6
Saturday, February 10, 20:04

Draw 7
Sunday, February 11, 9:05

Tiebreaker
Sunday, February 11, 20:05

Figure skating 

China qualified 11 figure skaters (6 men and 5 women), based on its placement at the 2017 World Figure Skating Championships in Helsinki, Finland.

Individual

Mixed

Team event

Freestyle skiing

China qualified six male and nine female freestyle skiers.

Aerials

Halfpipe

Moguls

Short track speed skating

According to the ISU Special Olympic Qualification Rankings, China had qualified a full squad of 5 men and 5 women each.

Men

Women

Qualification legend: ADV – Advanced due to being impeded by another skater; FA – Qualify to medal round; FB – Qualify to consolation round; OR – Olympic record; WR – World record

Skeleton 

China qualified one male skeleton athlete, Wenqiang Geng. This marked the country's Winter Olympics debut in the sport.

Ski jumping

China had qualified one female ski jumper.

Snowboarding

Freestyle

Qualification Legend: QF – Qualify directly to final; QS – Qualify to semifinal

Parallel

Qualification Legend: W – Winner; L – Loser

Speed skating

China earned the following quotas at the conclusion of the four World Cups used for qualification.

Men

Women

Mass start

Team pursuit

See also
China at the 2017 Asian Winter Games
China at the 2018 Winter Paralympics

References

Nations at the 2018 Winter Olympics
2018
Winter Olympics